Spinuș is one of the smallest communes in Bihor County, Crișana, Romania. It is composed of five villages: Ciulești (Csujafalva), Gurbești (Görbesd), Nădar (Nadántelek), Săliște (Kövesegyháza) and Spinuș.

It has a population 1,285 people (as of 2011). The Oradea-Brașov highway will pass through this commune in the near future. It is a wine-growing zone.

References

Communes in Bihor County
Localities in Crișana